Jagdgeschwader 104 (JG 104) was a Luftwaffe fighter-training-wing of World War II.

It was formed at Fürth-Herzogenaurach from Stab/Jagdfliegerschule 4 (JFS 4) on 20 March 1943. It was then stationed at Roth from 6 April 1944 until it was disbanded on 28 April 1945. Some of its commanding officers included Major Reinhard Seiler and Major Rolf Hermichen.

Fighter wings of the Luftwaffe 1933-1945
Military units and formations established in 1943
Military units and formations disestablished in 1945